Punciidae is a family of crustaceans belonging to the order Palaeocopida.

Genera:
 Manawa Hornibrook, 1949
 Promanawa McKenzie & Neil, 1983
 Puncia Hornibrook, 1949

References

Ostracods